The Sumathi Best Television Women's Program Award is presented annually in Sri Lanka by the Sumathi Group of Campany associated with many commercial brands for the best Sri Lankan television women's program of the year in television screen.

The award was first given in 2014. Following is a list of the winners of this prestigious title since then.

Awards

References

Awards established in 2014
2014 establishments in Sri Lanka